Anasarca is a severe and generalized form of edema, with subcutaneous tissue swelling throughout the body. Unlike typical edema, which almost everyone will experience at some time and can be relatively benign, anasarca is a pathological process reflecting a severe disease state and can involve the cavities of the body in addition to the tissues.

Signs and symptoms

Physical appearance
Can include:
 Periorbital edema "eye puffiness"
 Perioral edema 
 Upper extremity edema
 Ascites
 Lower extremity edema 
 Pre-tibial edema
 Pedal edema

Physical manifestations
Can include:
 Impaired vision, difficulty opening eyes
 Shortness of breath (SOB), dyspnea on exertion (DOE), orthopnea
 Chest pain
 Extreme discomfort 
 Debilitation

Cause
Anasarca is often caused by a decreased oncotic pressure.

Organ failure 
 Liver failure 
 Kidney failure 
 Right-sided heart failure

Malignancy

Diet 
 Severe protein deficiency

Systemic manifestations of 
 Nephrotic syndrome
 Protein-losing enteropathies 
 Capillary leak syndrome

In utero 
In Hb Barts, the high oxygen affinity results in poor oxygen delivery to peripheral tissues, resulting in anasarca.

Iatrogenic 
It can also be caused by the administration of exogenous intravenous fluid.

Diagnosis
Anasarca is a diagnosis made clinically and differentiated from edema by extent of body involvement and severity. Whereas edema is usually graded on a mild/moderate/severe scale and usually affects one or two regions of the body, anasarca affects the entire body and is the most severe form of edema, with subcutaneous tissue swelling from head to feet.

Testing
Although there is no definitive test to prove anasarca, many tests can be useful to aid in the diagnosis. Anasarca is most often seen in conjunction with a low level of albumin

A research paper published in 2001 demonstrated a linkage between low-voltage electrocardiogram (ECG) (LVE) (QRS complexes of <5 mm in the limb and <10 mm in the precordial leads) and Anasarca.

Treatment
Anasarca is a severe symptom, not a pathological process in and of itself; as such, the best treatment is to treat the underlying cause. However, there are a number of things that can be done to help get the fluid off as well as prevent further accumulation of fluid.

Diuretics
One of the mainstays of any edema treatment, diuretics are a category of medications that help the body excrete fluid by altering the way in which the kidney processes urine.
 Loop diuretics
 Thiazide diuretics
 Thiazide-like diuretics
 Potassium-sparing diuretics

Diet
The body more efficiently absorbs fluid from the gut and retains that fluid with the help of sodium and sugar. As such, decreasing salt and simple sugar intake will help prevent accumulation of fluid and potentiate the effect of any diuretics. 
Following a high protein diet will help provide one's body with the substrates necessary to produce albumin, the major protein in human plasma and the single most important molecule in maintaining the serum oncotic pressure.

Fiber
Bulking fiber, both soluble and insoluble dietary fiber, absorb water throughout the GI tract.
Viscous fiber can thicken the contents of the GI track and slow the absorption of other compounds (like simple sugars).

References

External links 

Medical signs
Symptoms and signs: Skin and subcutaneous tissue